Vicente David Bernabeu Armengol (born 9 January 1975 in Valencia) is a former Spanish professional road bicycle racer.

Palmarès 

2002
Tour du Finistère
1st, Overall, Troféu Joaquim Agostinho
1st, Stage 3
2004
1st, Overall, Volta a Portugal
1st, Overall, Troféu Joaquim Agostinho
8th Overall Tour de Pologne
2006
1st, Overall, Vuelta a Mallorca
1st, Trofeo Pollença

External links 

Spanish male cyclists
1975 births
Living people
People from Ribera Alta (comarca)
Sportspeople from the Province of Valencia
Volta a Portugal winners
Cyclists from the Valencian Community